Zarrin Dasht may refer to:
Zarrin Dasht County, Fars Province, Iran
Zarrin Dasht District, Hamadan Province, Iran
Zarrin Dasht Rural District, Ilam Province, Iran